Communauté Juive Libérale d'Île-de-France (CJL) is a Jewish community led by the Rabbi Pauline Bebe, the first (and until 2007 the only) woman rabbi in France. The community belongs to the Reform movement. The CJL is part of the World Union for Progressive Judaism which unites more than 1000 communities worldwide.

Although Reform Judaism is dominant within worldwide Judaism, it is still underdeveloped in France. In France, liberal Judaism is practiced by more than 15,000 people who are distributed in 16 communities belonging to several currents, including l’Union libérale israélite de France (ULIF), le Mouvement juif libéral de France (MJLF), and la Communauté juive libérale d’Île-de-France (CJL). The CJL and a few other Reform communities are not accepted within the orthodox Consistoire. The Consistoire was founded in 1808 after the French Revolution, when the Jews of France were granted civil rights under the direction of Napoleon, whose goal was to make mainstream Frenchmen out of the Jewish people.

To 1995 at 2006, the CJL's home was in the 18th arrondissement of Paris. The congregation originally resembled a chavurah, and was located in a small apartment. Since May 2006 the CJL have a new home, La Maison du judaïsme, in the 11th arrondissement of Paris. The Maison du judaïsme consists of a multi-purpose complex center with a synagogue, a theater, an art exhibit and a library, as well as classrooms and offices. It also has a cultural organization called NITSA. As of 2013, the congregation of the CJL consists of more than 400 households, and about 100 children regularly go to the Talmud Torah and benefits from a warm atmosphere.

See also
Pauline Bebe

References

External links
 Website of Communaute juive liberale

Reform synagogues in France
Synagogues in Paris
Jews and Judaism in France
Buildings and structures in the 11th arrondissement of Paris
World Union for Progressive Judaism